Adolphus Jean Sweet (July 18, 1920 – May 8, 1985) was an American actor, credited with nearly 60 television and film roles and more than 50 roles in stage productions, including performances on Broadway. He often played policemen throughout his career, and may be best known for his portrayal of police chief and father Carl Kanisky, on the sitcom Gimme a Break!, from 1981 until his death in May 1985.

Early life
Sweet was born in New York City, New York. In 1939, he attended the University of Alabama; however, he was called away from his education for a tour of duty in World War II with the 44th Bombardment Group (Heavy) of the Eighth Air Force, where the young Second Lieutenant served as a navigator on B-24 Liberator bomber aircraft. During his service, he was shot down over Romania while flying on Operation Tidal Wave, and subsequently spent two years as a prisoner of war (POW). He joined other POWs in putting on short plays in the prison camp, leading to an interest in acting when he returned from the war.

After the war, he played semi-professional football and boxed while earning his master's degree in English and comparative drama from Columbia University.

Career
Upon graduation, Sweet took a job teaching at Barnard College, rising to head of the drama department during his 12 years at the college. He left his teaching duties shortly after making his Broadway debut, at age 40, in a 1961 production of Rhinoceros, starring Zero Mostel.

Sweet landed his first major film role that same year, in the 1961 film The Young Doctors. He went on to make numerous appearances in films such as You're a Big Boy Now (1966), A Lovely Way to Die (1968), The Swimmer (1968) and Finian's Rainbow (1968) as the Sheriff. He also performed on television through the 1960s and 1970s, including roles on The Defenders, The Edge of Night, Another World as Police Chief Gil McGowan, and Dark Shadows.

Through the 1970s he was much in demand, with roles in films such as Colossus: The Forbin Project (1970), The Out-of-Towners (1970), The New Centurions (1972), Fear Is the Key (1972), Sisters (1972), Cops and Robbers (1973), The Lords of Flatbush (1974), Amazing Grace (1974), The Bad News Bears in Breaking Training (1977), Which Way Is Up? (1977), Go Tell the Spartans (1978), Heaven Can Wait (1978) and The Wanderers (1979). In addition to film roles, he also had guest starring roles on Little House on the Prairie and Mrs. Columbo. He had a notable role as FBI director J. Edgar Hoover in the 1978 television miniseries King, based on the life of civil rights leader Martin Luther King Jr.

As the 1980s began, Sweet worked steadily in such films as Below the Belt (1980) and Reds (1981), the made-for-television movie Gideon's Trumpet (1980), and television series like Hill Street Blues and Hart to Hart.

In addition to his numerous guest roles on episodes of various television series, Sweet had a recurring role, as a policeman, in the single 1965–66 season of the legal drama/comedy The Trials of O'Brien. He was well known for his recurring role as policeman Gil McGowan, third husband of Ada Davis (later Hobson), on the soap opera Another World (1972–1977). In keeping with his cop roles, Sweet also voiced the character of Manhattan Subway Transit Police Captain Costello in the 1974 film The Taking of Pelham One Two Three.

Sweet's best known television character was his series co-lead role as police chief and father Carl Kanisky, who was constantly at odds with housekeeper Nell Carter, on the sitcom Gimme a Break!. Sweet appeared in this role from 1981 until his death. Sweet was diagnosed with cancer during the series' fourth season, but he continued to work. The final episode of the fourth season aired on May 11, 1985, three days after he died, and just a few hours after his funeral.

Personal life
Sweet married Reba Gillespie while pursuing his master's degree after World War II. The couple had a son together, Jonathon (born ), before they divorced in 1973. In 1974, Sweet married Iris Braun.

Sweet died from stomach cancer at Tarzana Hospital in Tarzana, California, on May 8, 1985, survived by his wife and son. His Gimme a Break! co-star, Nell Carter, gave the eulogy at his funeral on May 11, and recorded a short eulogy to air that same night, at the start of the show's final episode for the season. Sweet's remains were cremated and his ashes were scattered at sea.

Filmography

References

External links

 
  
 
 
  

1920 births
1985 deaths
20th-century American male actors
American male film actors
American male soap opera actors
American male television actors
American prisoners of war in World War II
Columbia Graduate School of Arts and Sciences alumni
Deaths from cancer in California
Deaths from stomach cancer
Shot-down aviators
United States Army Air Forces officers
United States Army Air Forces personnel of World War II
World War II prisoners of war held by Germany